Nobody's Boy is a 1913 American silent film drama produced by Hardee Kirkland. The film stars Clarence Jonstone, Adrienne Kroell and Rose Evans. The film status is uncertain but a release flier survives which is now at the Margaret Herrick Library at the Academy of Motion Pictures Arts and Sciences, it was part of the Charles G. Clarke collection. The film was released on the same reel with The Yosemite Valley in Winter.

Plot
"Little Bobby", a ragged but good-hearted newsboy, is left an orphan by the death of his mother. Mrs. Lane, a rich society woman, loses her boy about the same time. She mourns the loss of her child and spends much of her time at his grave. One day while at the cemetery, she meets "Bobby" who is crying over the grave of his mother. Mrs. Lane questions the child, learns his story and adopts him.  "Bobby" becomes a model child, but one day, chancing to meet some other boys in play, he falls from grace by soiling his new clothes. Mrs. Lane reprimands him and sends him to his room.  "Bobby" misunderstands the motive of his punishment and decides to run away. He sneaks out of the house and goes to the grave of his mother. There he finds his foster mother, Mrs. Lane in the act of placing flowers on his own mother's grave. Unseen by her, the child hurries home and resolves to be the "bestest" boy in all the world thereafter.

Cast
 Clarence Johnson (as Clarence Jonstone) - Mrs. Lane
 Adrienne Kroell - Bobby, an orphan newsboy
 Rose Evans - Mrs. Parker

Notes

External links
 

1913 films
1913 drama films
American silent short films
1913 short films
Silent American drama films
American black-and-white films
1910s American films